Nzanyi (also known as Njanyi, Nzangi, Njai, Njeny, Zani, Zany, Jeng, Jenge, Njei, Njeing, Kobotshi) is an Afro-Asiatic language spoken in Nigeria in Adamawa State in Maiha LGA, and along the border in Cameroon. Dialects are Dede, Hoode, Lovi, Magara, Maiha, Mutidi, Nggwoli, Paka, and Rogede.

In Cameroon, Njanyi is spoken near the Nigerian border in the Doumo area (Mayo-Oulo commune, Mayo-Louti department, and in Dembo and Basheo communes, Bénoué department, Northern Region) by about 9,000 speakers. It is mainly spoken in Nigeria.

Notes 

Biu-Mandara languages
Languages of Nigeria
Languages of Cameroon